Wild Animals is the seventh studio album by Minnesota-based bluegrass group Trampled by Turtles, released on July 15, 2014. The cover art was inspired by metal sculptor Tomohiro Inaba's work.

Track listing

References

2014 albums
BanjoDad Records albums